The South American land mammal ages (SALMA) establish a geologic timescale for prehistoric South American fauna beginning 64.5 Ma during the Paleocene and continuing through to the Late Pleistocene (0.011 Ma). These periods are referred to as ages, stages, or intervals and were established using geographic place names where fossil materials where obtained.

The basic unit of measurement is the first/last boundary statement. This shows that the first appearance event of one taxon is known to predate the last appearance event of another. If two taxa are found in the same fossil quarry or at the same stratigraphic horizon, then their age-range zones overlap.

Background 
South America was an island continent for much of the Cenozoic, or the "Age of Mammals". As a result, its mammals evolved in their own unique directions, as Australia and Madagascar still have today.

Paleogeographic timeline 
A simplified paleogeographic timeline of South America:
 66 Ma – South America was connected to both North America and Antarctica. Soon after this point, it lost its connection to North America.
 66–50 Ma – Tiupampan to Casamayoran - South America was connected to Antarctica which, in turn, was connected to Australia. The Antarctica–Australia connection was lost around the end of this interval or perhaps as much as 15 million years later.
 50–34 Ma – Casamayoran to Tinguirirican - South America was connected to Antarctica, which was not yet covered by ice.
 34 Ma – Tinguirirican - South America and Antarctica became detached and glaciations started to form in Antarctica.
 34–9 Ma – Tinguirirican to Chasicoan - South America had no land connections to any other continent.
 9–3 Ma – Huayquerian to Chapadmalalan - islands formed between South and North America. A complete Isthmus of Panama most likely formed near the end of this interval, leading to the Great American Biotic Interchange (GABI).
 3 Ma to present – Uquian to Holocene - the land connection between South and North America is established and migration between the formerly separated continents occurs. The main migrational route is from north to south, rather than the opposite way. This led to much higher extinction levels of groups in South America than in North America.
 Pleistocene – the glacials and interglacials of the Pleistocene caused drastic eustatic sea level changes, widening and narrowing the land bridge at the 'bottleneck' of Panama. As a side-effect, the vegetation changed during this period of strong climatic changes.
 Late Pleistocene – the earliest humans  arrived in South America and settled in various parts of the continent. Evidence for cohabitation with the latest Pleistocene megafauna has been found at multiple locations, such as Monte Verde in coastal Chile and Tibitó on the Altiplano Cundiboyacense in Colombia.

Definitions

Cenozoic fossiliferous stratigraphic units in South America 
The following formations have provided vertebrate, insect or plant fossils, formations with other invertebrates are excluded:

Fossil content

See also 

 Biochronology
 North American land mammal age (NALMA)
 Asian land mammal age (ALMA)
 European land mammal age (ELMA or ELMMZ)
 List of fossiliferous stratigraphic units in Colombia
 List of fossiliferous stratigraphic units in Ecuador
 List of fossiliferous stratigraphic units in Paraguay
 List of fossiliferous stratigraphic units in Uruguay
 List of fossiliferous stratigraphic units in Venezuela

Notes and references

Notes

References

Bibliography

Paleogene



Paleogene
 

Pleistocene
 

Austral Basin
 
 

Santa María-Hualfín Basin
 
 

Santa Fe Province
 

Aconquija Formation
 
 
 

Agua de la Piedra Formation
 
 
 
 
 

Aisol Formation
 
 

Andalhuala Formation
 

Andesitas Huancache Formation
 
 

Arroyo Chasicó Formation
 
 
 

Belgrano Formation
 

Bororó Formation
 

Brochero Formation
 
 

Casamayor Formation
 
 

Cerro Azul Formation
 
 
 

Cerro Bandera Formation
 
 

Chapadmalal Formation
 
 
 
 

Chichinales Formation
 
 

Chiquimil Formation
 
 
 
 
 

Collón Curá Formation
 
 
 
 

Deseado Formation
 
 

Divisadero Largo Formation
 

La Ensenada Formation
 
 
 

Las Flores Formation, Sierra del Tontal
 

Las Flores Formation, Golfo San Jorge Basin
 
 
 

Fortín Tres Pozos Formation
 
  

Gaiman Formation
 
 

Geste Formation
 
 
 

Gran Bajo del Gualicho Formation
 

Hernandarias Formation
 

Huayquerías Formation
 
 

Huitrera Formation
 

India Muerta Formation
 

La Invernada Formation
 

Ituzaingó Formation
 
 
 

Koluel Kaike Formation
 

Laguna Brava Formation
 

Laguna del Hunco Formation
 

Lefipán Formation
 

Leticia Formation
 

Loma de Las Tapias Formation
 
 
 

Luján Formation
 
 

Lumbrera Formation
 
 
 

Maimará Formation
 
 
 

Maíz Gordo Formation
 

Mariño Formation
 
 

Mealla Formation
 

Miramar & San Andrés Formations
 
 
 

Monte Hermoso Formation
 
 
 
 
 

Monte León Formation
 

El Morterito Formation
 

Palo Pintado Formation
 
 
 

Paraná Formation
 
 
 

Peñas Coloradas Formation
  
 

Pinturas Formation
 
 

Piquete Formation
 

Playa de Los Lobos Allo Formation
 

Puerta del Diablo Formation
 

Puerto Madryn Formation
 
 

Quebrada de Los Colorados Formation
 
 
 
 

Río Chico Group
 

Río Foyel Formation
 
  

Río Loro Formation
 

Río Mayo Formation
 

Río Negro Formation
 

Río Quinto Formation
 

Saladillo Formation
 

Salamanca Formation
 
 
  
 
 

Saldungaray Formation
 

Salicas Formation
 

Santa Cruz Formation
 
 
 
 
 
 
 
  
 
 
 
 
 
 
 
 

Sarmiento Formation & Colhué Huapí Member
 
 
 
 
 
 
 
 
 
 

Toro Negro Formation
 

Uquía Formation
 
 
 

Vaca Mahuida Formation
 

Ventana Formation
 
 

Vorohué Formation
 
 
 

Yupoí Formation

Casira Formation
 

Cerdas beds
 

Honda Group
 
 
 
 

Lacayani fauna
 

Ñuapua Formation
 

Quehua Formation
 

Salla Formation
 
 
 

Santa Lucía Formation
 
 
 
 
 
 
 
 
 

Tarija Formation
 

Umala Formation
 

Yecua & Petaca Formations

Entre-Corrégos Formation
 

Fonseca Formation
 

Graxaim Formation
 

Guabirotuba Formation
 

Içá Formation
 

Itaboraí Formation
 
 
 
 
 
 

Maria Farinha Formation
 

Pirabas Formation
 

Rio Madeira Formation
 

Santa Vitória Formation
 

Solimões Formation
 
 
 
 
 

Touro Passo Formation
 

Tremembé Formation

Abanico Formation
 
 
 
 
 
 

Bahía Inglesa Formation
 
 
 
 
 
 
 
 
 
 
 
 
 

Caleta Herradura Formation
 

Chíu-Chíu Formation 
 

Chucal Formation
 

Coquimbo Formation
 

Cura-Mallín Group
 
 
 

Horcón Formation
 

Huaylas Formation
 
 

Loreto Formation
 
 
 
 

Navidad Formation
 

La Portada Formation
 

Río Baguales Formation
 

Río Frías Formation

Altiplano Cundiboyacense
 
 
 
 
 
 
 
 
 
 
 
 

Cesar-Ranchería Basin
 
 
 
 
 
 
 
 
 
 
 
 
 

Cocinetas Basin
 
 
 
 
 
 
 
 
 

Barzalosa Formation
 

Gualanday Group
 

Honda Group
 
 
 
 
 
 
 
 
 
 
 
 
 
 
 
 
 
 
 
 
 
 
 
 
 
 
 
 

Los Hoyos beds
 

Mugrosa Formation
 

Rotinet Formation
  

Sincelejo Formation

Biblián Formation
 

Dos Bocas Formation
 
 

Letrero Formation
 

Onzole Formation
 

Seca Formation

Chaco Formation

Peruvian Amazon
 
 

Sechura Basin
 

Chambira Formation
 
 
 

Chilcatay Formation
 
 
 
 

Chota Formation
 

Iñapari Formation
 
 

Madre de Dios Formation
 
 
 

Mogollón Formation
 
 

Moquegua Formation
 
 

Muñani Formation
 

Paracas Formation
 

Pisco Formation
 
 
 
 
 
 
 
 
 
 
 
 
 
 

Pozo Formation
 
 

Soncco Formation
 

Yahuarango Formation
 
 
 

Yumaque Formation

Pleistocene
 

Camacho Formation
 
 
 

Dolores Formation
 
 
 

Fray Bentos Formation
 
 

Raigón Formation
 

San José Formation
 

Sopas Formation

Chaguaramas Formation
 

Parángula Formation
 

Falcón Basin
Cantaure & Paraguaná Formations
 

Capadare Formation
 
 

Castillo Formation
 
 
 
 
 

Mesa Formation
 

Río Yuca Formation
 

San Gregorio Formation
 
 

Santa Inés Formation
 

Urumaco, Socorro & Codore Formations

Further reading 
 
 
 
 
 
 
 
 
 
 
 
 
 

 

 
South America